Paul-Pierre Philippe (16 April 1905 – 9 April 1984) O.P. was a Cardinal and Prefect of the Congregation for the Oriental Churches in the Roman Catholic Church.

Early life
He joined the Dominican Order in Paris in 1926 and was ordained on 6 July 1932. He was a faculty member of the Pontifical Athenaeum Angelicum, the future Pontifical University of St. Thomas Aquinas (Angelicum) in Rome from 1935 until 1939. During the war he served as an officer in the French Army. After the war he returned to Rome to teach until 1950.

Archbishop and Cardinal
Pope John XXIII appointed him titular Archbishop of Erocleopoli Maggiore on 28 August 1962 and he was consecrated on 21 September of that year at the hands of Pope John. He attended the Second Vatican Council. He was appointed Secretary of the Congregation for Religious on 14 December 1959.

He would remain secretary of the congregation until 28 June 1967, when he was appointed Secretary of the Congregation for the Doctrine of the Faith. He was created and proclaimed Cardinal-Deacon of S. Pio V a Villa on 5 March 1973. Pope Paul VI appointed him Prefect of the Congregation for the Oriental Churches the next day. He opted for the order of cardinal priests and his deaconry was elevated pro hac vice to title on 2 February 1983 after being ten years as a cardinal deacon.

Bibliography
The Blessed Virgin and the priesthood. Chicago: Regnery, 1955.
De Contemplatione Mystica in Historia. Romae: Angelicum, 1955.
The Ends of the Religious Life according to Saint Thomas Aquinas. Athens: Fraternity of the Blessed Virgin Mary, 1962.
The novitiate. Notre Dame: University of Notre Dame Press, 1961.
Principles for a Renewal of Religious Life : General Assembly of 1963.  Ottawa: Canadian Religious Conference, 1964.
Le rôle de l'amitié dans la vie chrétienne selon saint Thomas d'Aquin. Rome: Angelicum, 1938.

References

1905 births
1986 deaths
Writers from Paris
20th-century French cardinals
Participants in the Second Vatican Council
20th-century French Catholic theologians
French military personnel of World War II
French Dominicans
Dominican cardinals
Members of the Congregation for the Doctrine of the Faith
Members of the Congregation for the Oriental Churches
Cardinals created by Pope Paul VI
Patrons of the Sovereign Military Order of Malta
French male writers